Frank Fay (1870–1931), older brother of William Fay, was an actor and co-founder of the Abbey Theatre in Dublin, Ireland. He worked with his brother, William, staging productions in halls around the city. Finally, they formed W. G. Fay's Irish National Dramatic Company, focused on the development of Irish acting talent.

The brothers participated in the founding of the Abbey Theatre and were largely responsible for evolving the Abbey style of acting. After a falling-out with the Abbey directors in 1908, they emigrated to the United States to work in theatre there.

References
Print
Igoe, Vivien. A Literary Guide to Dublin. (Methuen, 1994) 
Ryan, Philip B. The Lost Theatres of Dublin. (The Badger Press, 1998) 

Online
Frank Fay at Infoplease

1870 births
1931 deaths
Abbey Theatre
Irish male stage actors
Theatre people from Dublin (city)